Myosotis alpestris or alpine forget-me-not is a herbaceous perennial plant in the flowering plant family Boraginaceae.

The alpine forget-me-not is the county flower of Westmorland in the United Kingdom and the state flower of Alaska in the United States. It grows well throughout Alaska in open, rocky places high in the mountains, flowering in midsummer. Native habitats include moist mountainous areas on wooded slopes and grassy meadows.

References

External links
 
 
 
 

alpestris
Flora of Alaska
Symbols of Alaska
Plants described in 1794
Flora without expected TNC conservation status